Season 1992–93 was the 109th football season in which Dumbarton competed at a Scottish national level, entering the Scottish Football League for the 87th time, the Scottish Cup for the 98th time, the Scottish League Cup for the 46th time and the Scottish Challenge Cup for the third time.

Overview 
Following the success of the previous season, Dumbarton went into the new league campaign with some confidence, particularly as the squad of players at the start remained virtually unchanged.  Within the first few months however the club were to lose the services of their top scorer (Jimmy Gilmour) and their captain (Jim Dempsey).  Nevertheless, by the end of October Dumbarton were up with the leaders but thereafter the results were to become more mixed and Dumbarton fell down the table, although were never in any real danger of relegation, and finished in 9th place

In the national cup competitions, it was a case of yet another season of early exits - but not only that, there were to be no goals either.  In the Scottish Cup it would be Premier Division Dundee who would end Dumbarton's ambitions in the third round.

In the League Cup, Rangers - the eventual winners of the cup - were the opponents and saw off Dumbarton easily in the second round.

Finally, it was a first round exit in the B&Q Cup - however the defeat to Hamilton would prove to be the first of that club's run to winning the cup itself.

Locally, in the Stirlingshire Cup it would be Premier Division Falkirk who would end Dumbarton's interest in the semi final.

Results and fixtures

Scottish First Division

Skol Cup

B&Q Cup

Tennant's Scottish Cup

Stirlingshire Cup

Pre-season/Other Matches

League table

Player statistics

Squad 

|}

Transfers

Players in

Players out

Reserve team
Dumbarton competed in the Scottish Reserve League (West), and with 8 wins and 5 draws from 28 games, finished 12th of 15.

In the Reserve League Cup, Dumbarton lost out to Hamilton in the first round.

Trivia
 The League match against Clydebank on 22 August marked Martin Melvin's 100th appearance for Dumbarton in all national competitions - the 102nd Dumbarton player to reach this milestone.
 The League match against Cowdenbeath on 5 September marked John Boyd's 100th appearance for Dumbarton in all national competitions - the 103rd Dumbarton player to reach this milestone.
 The League match against Raith Rovers on 6 February marked Jim Meechan's 100th appearance for Dumbarton in all national competitions - the 104th Dumbarton player to reach this milestone.
 The League match against Raith Rovers on 10 April marked Jim Marsland's 100th appearance for Dumbarton in all national competitions - the 105th Dumbarton player to reach this milestone.
 The League match against Kilmarnock on 1 May marked Paul Martin's 100th appearance for Dumbarton in all national competitions - the 106th Dumbarton player to reach this milestone.
 In an effort to draw a bigger crowd, Dumbarton decided to play their 'home' Scottish Cup tie against Rangers at Hampden Park.
 At the end of the season Billy Lamont decided to give up the manager's post in favour of the same at Alloa - and would be replaced by Murdo MacLeod.

See also
 1992–93 in Scottish football

References

External links
D McDonald (Dumbarton Football Club Historical Archive)
John Young (Dumbarton Football Club Historical Archive)
Scottish Football Historical Archive

Dumbarton F.C. seasons
Scottish football clubs 1992–93 season